The 2020 CONIFA World Football Cup would have been the fourth edition of the CONIFA World Football Cup, an international football tournament for states, minorities, stateless peoples and regions unaffiliated with FIFA organized by CONIFA. Somaliland were originally announced as the tournament host, but were forced to withdraw as hosts in August 2019. It was later announced that the tournament would be held in Skopje, the capital city of North Macedonia, with no CONIFA member as designated host. However, on 23 March 2020 CONIFA announced that the tournament would not be taking place in North Macedonia from 30 May – 7 June because of the coronavirus pandemic. The Tournament was eventually cancelled by CONIFA with the organisation outlining plans to expand continental tournaments.

Host selection
In January 2019, at the CONIFA Annual General Meeting in Krakow, Poland, it was announced that Somaliland had been selected to act as the host for the 2020 CONIFA World Football Cup. In August 2019 CONIFA announced that Somaliland had given up hosting rights for the 2020 ConIFA World Football Cup without naming a replacement. Kernow had subsequently bid to host the tournament. In December 2019 CONIFA announced that the tournament would be held in Skopje, the capital city of North Macedonia with no CONIFA member as designated host.

Venues

Qualification
CONIFA assigns the number of berths for each continent according to the percentage of CONIFA members that come from that continent. Europe has 4 berths, including one for the winners of the 2019 CONIFA European Football Cup. Asia and Africa both have 3, and North America, South America and Oceania have one berth each. Additionally, one berth is reserved for a wild card team. Kárpátalja, the defending champions, qualified automatically. Originally, Somaliland qualified automatically as hosts, but the tournament has since been moved to North Macedonia and no CONIFA member is hosting, so it was unclear whether Somaliland has still qualified.

Not all CONIFA members entered qualification, and in the continents of Africa and South America, an equal number of teams entered compared to the number of berths available, so all entrants from those continents qualified automatically.

Qualified teams

Controversy
The decision by CONIFA to originally host the 2020 World Football Cup in Somaliland was met with criticism by some, with James Scott, the president of Parishes of Jersey FC, telling the Jersey Evening Post that he would not accept the place at the final tournament if his side won the Atlantic Heritage Cup. The comments were met with a backlash from CONIFA, who criticised inaccurate reporting and defended the decision to host the World Football Cup in Somaliland. The competition was later moved to North Macedonia after Somaliland had hosting rights revoked by CONIFA.

Postponement and cancellation
On 22 March 2020, members of the CONIFA Executive Committee made the decision that the tournament would not be taking place in North Macedonia from 30 May – 7 June 2020 due to the COVID-19 emergency being seen across the world. On 29 April 2020 the CONIFA Executive Committee announced through its social media channels that the competition was cancelled, with no rescheduling, and the organisation outlining plans to expand continental competitions in the future by redirecting funding from the 2020 World Football Cup from sponsors Sportsbet.io.

Notes

References

CONIFA World Football Cup
CONIFA
CONIFA
CONIFA
2019–20 in North Macedonia football
International association football competitions hosted by North Macedonia
CONIFA World Football Cup